Viyyalavari Kayyalu is a 2007 Telugu film starring Uday Kiran and Neha Jhulka. E.Satti Babu directed this movie. L. Sreedhar, produced it under their banner Larsco Entertainments of Ramalakshmi Creations. It was released on 1 November 2007.

Plot
Vamshi (Uday Kiran) is a hair stylist who falls in love with Nandini (Neha Jhulka), sister of Bhoopathi Rayudu (Sri Hari), a good hearted factionist. Vamshi and Nandini decides to get married only with the consent of their elders. So Vamshi comes to Juturu, a village in Rayalaseema to convince Bhoopati Rayudu of his love with the latters sister. Initially Bhoopati doesn't like Vamshi and everyone laughs at Vamshi when he says that he is a hair stylist in city. But the pair believes that true love never runs away but stands brave even after initially being rejected. Bhoopati values the word given by any of his family members and stands by it. The second half shows the "Kayyalu" (light hearted quarrels) between the elders of the two sides. Vengal Reddy (Jaya Prakash) tries to become the MLA by violence and thinks of Bhoopati but in vain. Even after Vamshi convinces Bhoopati, he is worried on how to convince his parents. Uday is son of a Justice (Sayaji Shinde), a person who believes that one should not go beyond the law and hate corrupted ones. How the pair and Bhoopati convinces the Justice forms the rest of the plot.

Cast
 Uday Kiran as Vamshi
 Neha Jhulka as Nandini
 Sri Hari as Bhoopati Rayudu
 Jaya Prakash Reddy as Vengal Reddy
 Sayaji Shinde as Vamshi's father
 Kavitha
 Kausalya as Bhoopati Rayudu's wife
 Telangana Shakuntala
 Narsing Yadav
 Venu Madhav
 L. B. Sriram
 Lakshmipathi
 Sudeepa Pinky as Vamshi's sister

Soundtrack 
Ramana Gogula scored music for the movie and there was massive response to the audio. The audio of the film was launched at Prasad Labs at 11 am on 6 September 2007. Akkineni Nageswara Rao released the audio and handed over the first cassette to Dr D Ramanaidu. Supreme Music is marketing the album. The album was an instant hit.

Telusa Cheli  - Naveen, Ganga
Surude Sare Annadu - K. S. Chitra, Ramana, Sri Krishna
Neelala Neekallu - Sri Krishna, Sunitha
Manmatha - Kalpana, Vijayalakshmi
Hey Hand Some - Ramana Gogula, Kalpana
Mallechenda - R. P. Patnaik, Ganga
Neelala Neekallu (English Remix) - Ramana

Reception 
A critic from Rediff.com said that "On the whole, an entertaining film". A critic from Sify wrote that "Viyyalavari Kayyalu is a good love story with all the correct masala ".

References

External links 
 

2007 films
2000s Telugu-language films
Films directed by E. Satti Babu